Spermozoros is a genus of angel insects in the family Zorotypidae. There are six described species in Spermozoros, transferred to Spermozoros from the genus Zorotypus as a result of research published in 2020.

Species
These species belong to the genus Spermozoros:
 Spermozoros asymmetricus (Kocarek, 2017)
 Spermozoros huangi (Yin & Li, 2017)
 Spermozoros impolitus (Mashimo, Engel, Dallai, Beutel & Machida, 2013)
 Spermozoros medoensis (Huang, 1976)
 Spermozoros sinensis (Huang, 1974)
 Spermozoros weiweii (Wang, Li & Cai, 2016)

References

Zoraptera
Insect genera